International radio broadcasters are legally licensed stations that broadcast from a host nation to another nation or nations. Such stations are operated both as non-commercial enterprises such as the BBC World Service, and commercial operations such as WWCR. The following is a list of such stations with links to entries about each one:

A
Arirang Radio -  public English radio station promoting South Korea
Voice of America - broadcasting from studios in Washington, D.C., United States, and transmitting by a network of terrestrial transmitters in various countries linked by the use of global satellite services.
Radiodifusión Argentina al Exterior
 Radio Australia
 Radio Free Asia
 Amar FM 
 Radio Ayecah International USA

B
BBC World Service - broadcasting from studios at Broadcasting House in London, England; (Bush House until June 2012 and transmitting by a network of terrestrial transmitters in various countries linked by the use of global satellite services.
Radio Bulgaria

C
 Radio Cairo (ERTU; Egypt)
 Radio Canada International
 Channel Africa (South Africa)
 Voice of Croatia
 China Radio International
 CVC RADIO INDIA

D
Democratic Voice of Burma - Burmese opposition broadcasting service based in Oslo, Norway.
Deutsche Welle - the official international broadcasting service of Germany.

E
 Radio Exterior de España (international section of Radio Nacional de España; Spain)
 Radio Free Europe/Radio Liberty - a non-profit organization in Prague, founded by the US-Government and the National Committee for a Free Europe

F
 Radio France Internationale - Radio France Internationale (RFI)

G
 Voice of Greece

H
 Radio Habana Cuba
 HCJB (Ecuador)

I
 All India Radio Official website Url www.allindiaradio.org and www.newsonair.nic.in
 Voice of Indonesia
 Islamic Republic of Iran Broadcasting
Israel Radio International

J
 Radio Japan - Radio Japan offers live radio programs on the Internet which are originally aired outside Japan over short-wave. www.nhk.or.jp

K
Voice of Kenya
KBS World Radio (the former Radio Korea International, Radio Korea and Voice of Free Korea; South Korea)
Voice of Korea (the former Radio Pyongyang; North Korea)

L
Radio Luxembourg

M
Radio Maria
Voice of Malaysia
Magyar Rádió (Hungary)
Médi 1  (also known as Radio Méditerranée Internationale)

N
 Nepali Sanchar Radio
 Radio Nepal
 Radio New Zealand
 voice of youth Nirmala
 voice of Reshmi Xavier

O
Austrian Radio Ö1 International (the former Radio Austria International)

P
 Radio Prague (Czech Republic)
 Polskie Radio (the former Radio Polonia; Poland)
 RDP Internacional (Rádio e Televisão de Portugal) Portugal

Q

R
 Radio Canada International
 Radio Prague
 Radio RAI International (Italy)
 Radio Romania International
 Voice of Russia - the former Radio Moscow

S
 Singapore Broadcasting Corporation
 Radio Slovakia International
 Sri Lanka Broadcasting Corporation
 SR International - Radio Sweden

T
 Radio Taiwan International (the former Voice of Free China)
 Radio Thailand (Other Name is National Broadcasting Services of Thailand)
 Radio Tirana (Albania)
 Trans World Radio
 Voice of Turkey

U
Radio Ukraine International
United Nations Radio

V
 Vatican Radio
Voice of Vietnam
Radio Vlaanderen Internationaal (Belgium)

W
WRN Broadcast

X

Y

Z

International radio networks
Lists of radio stations